This is a list of mayors of Billings, Montana.

Pre-charter government
John Tully
William P. Matheson (July 1885 – April 1887)
James R. Gross (April 1887 – April 1888)
E.B. Camp (April 1888 – May 1889)
Fred Foster (May 1889 – April 1890)
Dr. Joseph Rinehart (April 1890 – April 1891)
George Griggs (April 1891 – April 1892)
H.K. Fish (April 1892 – January 1893)
John D. Losekamp (January 1893 – April 1893)
Fred Foster (April 1893 – April 1894)
George Griggs (April 1895 – May 1897)
Dr. Henry H. Chapple (May 1897 – August 1898) (resigned)
P.H. Smith (August 1898 – April 1899)
Chris Yegen (April 1899 – May 1901)
W.B. George (May 1901 – May 1903)
Fred Foster (May 1903 – April 1909)
H.J. Thompson (April 1909 – May 1911)
Frank Woods (May 1911 – April 1912)
Robert Leavens (April 1912 – April 1915)
Dr. E.A. Gerhart (April 1915 – April 1917)
W.M. Johnston (April 1917 – April 1919)
W. Lee Mains (April 1919 – April 1921)
William V. Beers (April 1921 – February 1925)
Edwin Grafton (February 1925 – February 1927) (resigned)
Arthur Trennery (February 1927 – April 1931)
Fred Tilton (April 1931 – December 1933) (died in office)
C.J. Williams (1933–1937)
Charles T. Trott (1937–1943)
Harry E. Biddinger (1943–1949)
Thompson T. Rowe (1949–1953)
Earle Knight (1953–1959)
Carl J. Clavadetscher (1959–1962, resigned)
Harold E. Gerke (1962–1963)
Willard E. Fraser (1963–1969)
Howard E. Hultgren (1969–1971)
Willard E. Fraser (1971–1972, died in office)
Joseph A. Leone (1972–1977)

Charter government
William B. Fox (1977–1984)
James V. Arsdale (1984–1990)
Richard L. Larson (1990–1996)
Chuck F. Tooley (1996–2005)
Ronald Tussing (2005–2009)
Tom Hanel (2009–2017)
Bill Cole (2017–present)

Reference

See also
 Timeline of Billings, Montana

Billings
Government of Billings, Montana